Mariam Mint Ahmed Aicha is a Mauritanian politician. Her name is sometimes given as Mariam Mint Ahmed Aiche or Mariam bint Ahmed Aiche. From 1992 until 1994, she served as Minister of Women's Affairs; from 1994 until 1995 she was Secretary of Women's Affairs. Her father is Cheikh Ahmed Aicha, a notable of the country who made sure that his children received a very good education. She was born and raised in the City of Boutilimit known for its academics, intellectuals and senior government officials since the country's independence until today, called the cultural capital of Mauritania.

She is the President of the Association Mauritanienne pour la Promotion de la Famille (AMPF) which was founded in 1990, focused primarily sensitizing both the general population and the country’s political and religious leaders to the personal and economic benefits of family planning, and on promoting provision of proper sexual and reproductive health (SRH) services. AMPF provides SRH services including family planning (FP), antenatal and post-natal counselling, mother and child immunization, paediatrics, incomplete abortion care and referral, HIV and AIDs protection including PMTCT, and general SRH counselling. 

Sensitization and awareness creation is indirectly carried out through children’s vaccination clinics, through programmes providing nutritional advice, and through general maternal and child health services (a critical requirement in a country subject to high levels of maternal and child mortality).

AMPF is committed to improving women’s status as a fundamental principle if the nation’s demographic circumstances are to change for the better. Spreading awareness of the benefits of birth spacing is an important component in this, as is the promotion of economic opportunities for women. AMPF has been involved in the creation of a number of craft-based co-operatives in pursuit of this aim. Special efforts have been made to reach marginalized and under-served populations.
 
AMPF’s efforts in advocacy and policy dialogue contributed to enacting the Reproductive Health Act, a Religious judgment outlawing female genital mutilation (FGM) and other harmful practices. AMPF enjoys a good reputation and has strategic partnerships with the Ministry of Health, other CSOs, and with the UNFPA.

References

Possibly living people
Government ministers of Mauritania
Women government ministers of Mauritania
20th-century Mauritanian women politicians
Year of birth missing